Nicolae Puiu (6 December 1935 – 4 February 1970) was a Romanian boxer. He competed at the 1960 Summer Olympics and the 1964 Summer Olympics. At the 1964 Summer Olympics, he defeated Cornelis van der Walt of Northern Rhodesia before losing to Louis Johnson of the United States.

References

External links

1935 births
1970 deaths
Romanian male boxers
Olympic boxers of Romania
Boxers at the 1960 Summer Olympics
Boxers at the 1964 Summer Olympics
Sportspeople from Reșița
Bantamweight boxers